Jigjeegiin Javzandulam (born 17 September 1944) is a Mongolian cross-country skier. She competed in two events at the 1964 Winter Olympics.

References

External links
 

1944 births
Living people
Mongolian female cross-country skiers
Olympic cross-country skiers of Mongolia
Cross-country skiers at the 1964 Winter Olympics
Place of birth missing (living people)
20th-century Mongolian women